Guy Verhoeven (18 March 1938 – 31 July 2020) was a Belgian field hockey player. He competed in the men's tournament at the 1964 Summer Olympics.

References

External links
 

1938 births
2020 deaths
Belgian male field hockey players
Olympic field hockey players of Belgium
Field hockey players at the 1964 Summer Olympics
Sportspeople from Antwerp